A ballast tractor is a specially weighted tractor unit of a heavy hauler combination. It is designed to utilize a drawbar to pull or push heavy or exceptionally large trailer loads which are loaded in a hydraulic modular trailer. When feasible, lowboy-style semi-trailers are used to minimize a load's center of gravity. Typical drivetrains are 6×4 and 6×6 but also available in 8×6 and 8×8. Typical ballast tractor loads include oil rig modules, bridge sections, buildings, ship sections, and industrial machinery such as generators and turbines.

Only a handful of manufacturers produce dedicated ballast tractors. Extra-heavy-duty chassis versions of mass-production tractor units are fitted with drawbar hitches and a separate ballast box as an alternative. These units are classified as N3 Category of Large goods vehicle. Ballast tractors can be traced back to the 1940s when heavy haulers from the UK started employing purpose-built Scammell Showtracs a short wheelbase 4x2 ballast tractor.

Increasingly, remote-controlled, self-propelled modular transporters (SPMT) are being employed in traditional ballast tractor/trailer roles.

Description 

The ballast tractor's name derives from the nautical term “sailing ballast” describing heavy material added to a vessel to improve stability. For a ballast tractor, ballast is added over the driving wheels to maximize traction. The additional weight increases the friction between the tyres and the road surface, allowing the tractor to overcome the inertia and friction of moving a heavy trailed load. Without it, there would be unproductive wheelspin.

With a semi-trailer, ballast is added in the form of the weight of the attached trailer pressing down upon the tractor's fifth wheel. Since the load is separate from a ballast tractor, it provides no ballast: the drawbar only transmits a horizontal force.

High inertia is encountered when starting to move a heavy load. To overcome this, ballast tractors tend to have high-powered, low geared engines that provide substantial torque, especially at low speeds. Additionally, ballast tractors are often fitted with heavy-duty hub reduction axles, a combination resulting in exceptionally low maximum speeds.

A strong chassis is required to both support the extra ballast weight and pulling forces transmitted by the drawbar. A reinforced chassis also allows multiple tractors to be coupled together to maximize power and traction. Heavy-duty versions of commercial tractor units may be fitted with a ballast box and suitable drawgear, or a ballast tractor may be purpose-built. Ballast is placed above the driving axle, or spread out over multiple driving axles to maximize traction on each and evenly distribute its load. Conversion from a regular tractor to a ballast tractor may require some modifications like chassis alteration, extra axle, larger tires, ballast box, and a heavy-duty gearbox so that it can handle the extra weight. The heavy-duty tractors which are usually converted into ballast tractors have 6x4, 8x6 axle configuration, hub reduction, better suspension and a powerful engine ranging from 300 to 1000hp.

A purpose built ballast tractor tends to be the heaviest class of on-road trucks. In some cases, its kerb weight can be greater than their axle configuration's legal Gross Vehicle Weight (GVW) permits, requiring special permission to use public roads. Some nations have categorized these tractors in a different category than conventional tractors because of higher GVW permits and HMT configuration. In 2015 Scania R580 was registered as first ballast tractor with GVW of 200 tons when coupled with suitable hydraulic modular trailer configuration in India by Automotive Research Association of India certification. Automotive Research Association has categorized ballast tractors as puller in India.

Typical ballast tractor configurations employ an independent drawbar trailer, hydraulic modular trailer, or dolly trailer. An advantage of using ballast tractors is the ability to push-steer a trailer around a corner. A girder trailer, for example, is double-articulated, so the front tractor can pull the load around a corner while the rear tractor pushes it through, thereby making the load more maneuverable than a simple towing configuration. Use of a following tractor also can increase control and brake force descending an incline.

Equipment

Ballast box 
The ballast box is a metal box installed on the rear chassis of the tractor instead of the fifth wheel coupling. Earlier heavy haulers unmounted the fifth wheel and used merely a piece or two of heavy rocks, stones or concrete blocks which weighted enough to avoid wheel spin, later builders and heavy haulers developed metal boxes of different designs to match the tractor layout. These boxes were filled with concrete or steel to increase the weight of the tractor. The problem with ballast tractors was the weight of ballast itself weighted over 10, 20 or even 40 tons in some scenario. Other designs also included sleeping cabins in the ballast for the drivers and the crew for longer journeys and harsh weather conditions, this made the height of the tractors increase significantly these units are still used today in the gulf area due to extreme heat. Some units have factory fitted ballast box with appropriate weight to meet with the regional guidelines, these tractors units do not have fifth wheel and drive out from the factory with a ballast box. Heavy haul operators convert heavy-duty tractors to ballast tractors with an aftermarket ballast box built by a builder or by themselves. 

New age power boosters which are external engine an accessory of hydraulic modular trailer can also be mounted on the tractor chassis to act as a ballast, saving a lot of space on the trailer itself for the loads and most important avoid application of extra tractors. Mammoet and Scheuerle (Member of the TII Group) have proved this configuration in 2019 on a difficult terrain in Norway. Almost all HMT manufacturers have their own variant of power booster.

Drawbar coupling
Drawbar coupling is a special tow hitch mounted on the front end or rear end of the tractor, sometimes both, it connects the HMT to the ballast tractor. Earlier coupling consisted of in house made metal hitch which had loops to lock drawbar eyes with a pin. Later fifth wheel manufacturers like Jost Rockinger and Ringfeder developed heavy-duty drawbar couplings with a 50 mm loop, drawbars and drawbar eyes which were built with higher quality and standards this increase the safety significantly. These couplings can be mounted on both ends of the tractor for push or pull applications. Some manufacturers also provide tractors with drawbar coupling fitted from the factory.

Manufacturers
Only a handful of manufacturers produce dedicated ballast tractors. Most high-volume manufacturers offer heavy-duty chassis versions of certain tractor units, which enable a ballast box to be fitted. In Europe, manufacturers tend to send some of their products to another company (owned by the parent) to be converted into a special heavy-duty version.

Belarus
Volat
Belgium
MOL

Canada
Hayes
Pacific

Czech Republic
Tatra

France
Nicolas Tractomas 8×8 and 10×10 ultra-heavy-duty tractors
PRP
Willème

Germany
 Tadano Faun GmbH
 MAN / ÖAF
 Mercedes-Benz (Titan)

India
 Volvo Trucks India
 Scania India

Italy
Astra-SIVI (Iveco)

Netherlands
 DAF (GINAF)

Russia (formerly Soviet Union)
 MAZ
 NAMI

Spain
TBO Trabosa
TMU

Switzerland
NAW

UK
AEC
Atkinson Vehicles
ERF
Foden Trucks
Rotinoff Motors – 35 heavy haulage tractors were built by the company between 1952 and 1959, of which 11 are known to survive.
Scammell – Many early examples, now used and seen as showman's vehicles, originally served with the army.
Thornycroft -such as Thornycroft Antar
Unipower

USA
 Diamond T - Ex-army Diamond T M20 tank transports were popular post World War II with heavy hauliers in the UK.
 Kenworth
 Mack
 White
 Oshkosh Corporation

Operators

Most heavy haulage and heavy lift engineering firms employ heavy duty tractor-unit models that can accommodate a ballast box. Countries where modernization is taking place, such as regions of the Middle East and South Africa and Asia, operate larger number of ballast tractors due to the greater frequency of heavy loads (such as power station components) and infrastructure projects.

Apart from being used by fairgrounds as a direct replacement for the steam-powered showman's engine, specialist moving and haulage companies use ballast tractors. These include:
Alstom
Mammoet
Pickfords
Sarens

Gallery

See also

Heavy hauler
Prime mover
 Ringfeder
Road locomotive – steam-powered fore-runner of the ballast tractor
Toter
Tractor unit
Sisu K-50SS

References

External links

Extremely large collection of heavy haulage photos 

Trucks
Heavy haulage